Robertson–Cataract Electric Building, also known as The Corn Exchange and 100 South, is a historic commercial building located in downtown Buffalo in Erie County, New York. It was built in 1915–1916, and is a four-story, five bay, reinforced concrete building faced in brick in the Renaissance Revival-style. The building was expanded in 1919. It features terra cotta and polychromatic brick details in hues of red, brown, and purple.  It originally housed a retail showroom and warehouse space for the Robertson–Cataract Electric Co.

In July 2012, global engineering firm T. Y. Lin International announced it would lease 6,500 square feet in the building.

It was listed on the National Register of Historic Places in 2012.

References

Commercial buildings on the National Register of Historic Places in New York (state)
Renaissance Revival architecture in New York (state)
Commercial buildings completed in 1919
Industrial buildings completed in 1919
Buildings and structures in Buffalo, New York
National Register of Historic Places in Buffalo, New York